Dereviane is a village in the Rivne Raion (district) of Rivne Oblast (province) in western Ukraine. Its population is 757 as of the 2001 Ukrainian Census.

Local Government 
The Village Rada. October Square 1, Village Zoria, Rivne Raion, Rivne Oblast, Ukraine, 35314
Ph.: +380-27-95-88

Famous people from Dereviane 
 Gavrýlo Fedorovich Shilo, Ukrainian linguist and lexicographer was born in 1910 in Dereviane.
 Andrew P. Layko, Ukrainian military personnel, soldier of Ukrainian People's Army, chorąży of Anders' Army, participant Battle of Monte Cassino was born in 1897 in Dereviane.

References

External links 
 Weather in the Dereviane 

Villages in Rivne Raion